The Bannerton Solar Park is a solar power station in the locality of Bannerton southeast of Robinvale in the Sunraysia district of Victoria. It generates up to 88MW of electricity to the National Electricity Market (NEM).

Bannerton Solar Park is the second solar farm to be funded by the Clean Energy Finance Corporation (after the Gannawarra Solar Farm). It is also funded by Hanwha Energy Australia, parent company of Nectr. It uses 320,000 solar panels to generate 110MW/88MW of electricity. It has offtake agreements with Alinta Energy and Yarra Trams.

CIMIC Group company UGL Limited designed and built the solar farm, including  single axis tracking system, substation and connection to the Powercor Australia grid. It is built on land unsuitable for Almond orchards.

Bannerton is near the edge of the Victorian electricity grid. The Solar Farm exports electricity at 66kV into the distribution network to support the local grid in responding to the load imposed from irrigation in summer.

References

Solar power stations in Victoria (Australia)